Peter Christian Bredal (1683–1756) was a Norwegian vice admiral of the Imperial Russian Navy.

References

1683 births
1756 deaths
Imperial Russian Navy admirals
Russian people of Norwegian descent
Norwegian admirals